Operation Talwar (Operation Sword) was the naval operation carried out by the Indian Navy during the Kargil War of 1999. It was one of the three operations at that time carried out by the Indian Air Force, Indian Army and the Indian Navy respectively. The operation's goal was to choke Pakistani trade channels.

Background

The Indian Navy carried out Operation Talwar to weaken Pakistan. The Eastern Fleet and Western Fleet were combined to block Arabian Sea routes. It also conducted naval drills in the Arabian Sea.

References 

Kargil War
Battles in 1999